David R. Kedrowski (March 15, 1942) was a Democratic politician and legislator from Wisconsin.

Born in Wisconsin Rapids, Wisconsin, Kedrowski graduated from the University of Wisconsin–Stevens Point in 1966. He served in the Wisconsin State Assembly for four terms, and was the Speaker pro tempore. He was a member of the Bayfield County Democratic Party, the Washburn Men's Club, and the Washburn Snowmobile Club.

Notes

University of Wisconsin–Stevens Point alumni
1942 births
Living people
Democratic Party members of the Wisconsin State Assembly